Židlochovice is a town in Brno-Country District in the South Moravian Region of the Czech Republic. It has about 3,700 inhabitants.

Geography
It lies in the Dyje–Svratka Valley. The town is situated in the valley of the river Svratka.

History
The first written mention of Židlochovice is from 1237. Among the owners of the Židlochovice estate were the houses of Pernštejn, Zierotin, Dietrichstein, and Habsburg. In 1873, Židlochovice was promoted to a town.

Until 1918, Groß Seelowitz – Židlochovice (named Seelowitz before 1867) was part of the Austrian monarchy (Austria side after the compromise of 1867), in the Auspitz – Hustopeče District, one of the 34 Bezirkshauptmannschaften in Moravia.

Sights
The landmark of the town is the Židlochovice Castle. It was originally built in the 14th century as a water fortress, then it was gradually rebuilt into an aristocratic residence. The main reconstruction was the Baroque reconstruction that took place during the rule of Count Philipp Ludwig Wenzel von Sinzendorf between 1696 and 1742, who chose Židlochovice as his main seat. Today it is owned by a state company which takes care of the forests, and is not accessible to the public. The castle includes a  large castle park, which was founded in the early 18th century and is freely accessible.

Notable people
Jan IV of Pernštejn (1487–1548), nobleman; died here
Wenzel von Linhart (1821–1877), Austrian surgeon
Maurice Strakosch (1825–1887), American musician and impresario
Manó Kogutowicz (1851–1908), Hungarian cartographer
Archduke Friedrich, Duke of Teschen (1856–1936), nobleman and supreme commander
Archduke Charles Stephen of Austria (1860–1933), nobleman and admiral
Archduke Eugen of Austria (1863–1954), nobleman and army commander

Twin towns – sister cities

Židlochovice is twinned with:
 Gbely, Slovakia
 Montevago, Italy

References

External links

Populated places in Brno-Country District
Cities and towns in the Czech Republic